Mourad Idoudi (born September 3, 1984) is a Paralympian athlete from Tunisia competing mainly in category F32 throwing events.

Mourad competed at the 2008 Summer Paralympics in Beijing, China where he won gold medals in both the F32/51 club throw and the F32/51 discus as well as a silver in the F32 shot put.

References

External links 
 

1984 births
Living people
Tunisian male shot putters
Tunisian male discus throwers
Paralympic athletes of Tunisia
Paralympic gold medalists for Tunisia
Paralympic silver medalists for Tunisia
Athletes (track and field) at the 2008 Summer Paralympics
Medalists at the 2008 Summer Paralympics
Paralympic medalists in athletics (track and field)
20th-century Tunisian people
21st-century Tunisian people